Ryan David Edell (born July 6, 1983), is an American professional baseball player. A pitcher.

Career 
Edell attended Lexington High School, College of Charleston, and University of California, Irvine before being drafted by the Cleveland Indians. Since 2005, Edell has played in minor league baseball with the Mahoning Valley Scrappers, Lake County Captains, Kinston Indians, and Akron Aeros.  
 
With the Akron Aeros in 2008, Edell pitched a career-high 144.1 innings.

External links 

1983 births
Akron Aeros players
American expatriate baseball players in Taiwan
Columbus Clippers players
Kinston Indians players
Lake County Captains players
Mahoning Valley Scrappers players
Midland RockHounds players
Lehigh Valley IronPigs players
Living people
Reading Phillies players
Uni-President 7-Eleven Lions players
Lexington High School alumni